Rareș Mihai Pop (born 14 June 2005) is a Romanian professional footballer who plays as a right midfielder for Liga I club UTA Arad.

Club career
Pop made his Liga I debut for UTA Arad on 1 May 2022, coming on for David Miculescu in the 79th minute of a 0–1 away loss to FC U Craiova. He scored his first professional goal on 19 October that year, in a 2–2 draw with FCSB in the Cupa României.

On 11 February 2023, Pop netted his first Liga I goal and provided an assist in a 3–1 home victory over Botoșani, and on 2 March scored again in a 1–2 away loss to five-time defending champions CFR Cluj.

Career statistics

Club

References

External links

2005 births
Living people
Sportspeople from Arad, Romania
Romanian footballers
Association football midfielders
Liga I players
FC UTA Arad players
Romania youth international footballers